Peter N. Willis (26 October 1937 – 20 July 2021) was an English association football referee, who operated in the Football League. He originated from Newfield, near Bishop Auckland, County Durham, and lived in Meadowfield. His other occupation was as a police officer.

Early life
He was educated at Spennymoor Grammar School, and later played amateur football for Tow Law Town. He was signed by Newcastle United, but never played above reserve level for them, eventually giving up to join the police force. He served at Cassop and Quarrington Hill, also playing football for their local teams. Throughout his career, his wife Helen had been "hugely supportive".

Career
Before one of those local matches in 1963, the appointed referee failed to turn up. Willis took charge of the game, and soon after formally trained as a referee.

He became a Football League linesman in 1968. He was promoted to the supplementary list of referees in 1971 and then the full list in 1972.

He was appointed to the Football League Cup Final of 1982, when Liverpool defeated Tottenham 3–1, after extra time.

Willis refereed the 1985 FA Cup Final between Manchester United and Everton, which United won 1–0, courtesy of a Norman Whiteside goal during extra time. This appointment made him one of very few non-FIFA referees to control both major English Cup Finals. In a 2002 newspaper article, Willis commented: "Moran just kicked him. Peter Reid might well have gone higher up in the air than he needed to but I saw what happened and I had a decision to make. I either put the whistle on the ground and walked off, or applied the laws of the game and sent him off."

Moran put his side of it in a 2006 interview: "... I didn't think it was a foul; I had no intention of pulling Peter Reid down and felt I never touched him. I went into the tackle from the side and his momentum flicked him over, as if I'd clattered him. I couldn't believe it when I got a straight red."

Moran therefore became the first player ever to be dismissed from the field of play in an FA Cup Final. Willis said: "It's never caused me a problem. I've never felt guilty about it, because it was the right decision. I just wish it hadn't happened because I'd rather be remembered for other reasons." (The Red Card was not shown, because Red & Yellow Cards were not shown in English Football League matches between January 1981 and August 1987.)

Following this match he had one final season on the league list (1985–1986). His last match was at Goodison Park where Everton needed to beat Southampton to have any chance of retaining the league title. They did indeed win (6–1) but Liverpool won at Chelsea to claim the honour.

He is said to be one of only five freemasons to have been in charge of an FA Cup Final.

He was president of the Referees' Association from 1984 to 2002. He suffered a stroke in 2000, which was a factor in his deciding to stand down from the presidency.

At the annual dinner of the Durham County Referees' Society, held at Bishop Auckland Town Hall on 23 November 2002, Willis was honoured with a life membership of the Referees' Association.

Personal life and death 
Willis died on 20 July 2021, at the age of 83.

References

Print
 Football League Handbooks, 1968–1970
 Rothmans Football Yearbooks, 1971–1986

1937 births
2021 deaths
British police officers
English football referees
FA Cup Final referees
Sportspeople from Bishop Auckland
Tow Law Town F.C. players
People educated at Spennymoor Grammar School
Association footballers not categorized by position
English footballers
English Freemasons